Dallarca is a village in the Gerger District, Adıyaman Province, Turkey. The village is populated by Kurds of the Cikan tribe and had a population of 204 in 2021.

The hamlets of Aydınlık, Erdoğmuş and Mazılı are attached to the village.

References

Villages in Gerger District
Kurdish settlements in Adıyaman Province